Tukas (also Romanized as Tūkās; also known as Takās) is a village in Shuil Rural District, Rahimabad District, Rudsar County, Gilan Province, Iran. At the 2006 census, its population was 281, in 80 families.

References 

Populated places in Rudsar County